The National Route 19 (route nationale 19 or N19) is a road between 
Melilla and Tendrara  (via Beni Ansar, Nador, Selouane, Hassi Berkane, Taourirt and Debdou).

An extension of the east–west railway line in Morocco runs from Nador for 100 km to Taourirt. Most of the line follows the same route as the National road 19.

References

Roads in Morocco